Grace Eiko Thomson (born 1933) is a Japanese Canadian internment camp survivor. She is the founder of the Nikkei National Museum and Cultural Centre in British Columbia and a memoirist.

Early life
She was born Eiko Nishikihama in 1933 in the Japanese Fishermen's Hospital in the Steveston neighbourhood of Richmond, British Columbia, Canada. Her father, Taguchi Torasaburo, and mother, Sawae, were both naturalized Canadian citizens, having emigrated from Japan, and she was one of five children the couple raised in Vancouver's Japantown, or Paueru-gai. In 1942 the family was upended when they were forcibly relocated to an internment site in Minto City, in accordance with the War Measures Act. The family was not allowed to return to their coastal home after the war, moving to Middlechurch, Manitoba, and eventually settling in Winnipeg in 1949 when restrictions on the movement of Japanese Canadians were finally lifted. In 1959, she married Alistair MacDonald Thomson, and the couple would have two children of their own.

Career
Thomson always had a keen interest in the arts and earned a Bachelor of Fine Arts degree from the University of Manitoba in 1977 as a mature student and later a master's degree from the University of Leeds. She has worked as a curator at art galleries in Manitoba, Saskatchewan, and British Columbia, and as an advisor to the Sanavik Inuit Cooperative in Nunavut. In the 1990s she returned to Vancouver to help care for her mother, accepting a position at the Burnaby Art Gallery.

In 1995 Thomson was asked to coordinate an event for artists of Japanese heritage from across Canada, sparking a renewed interest in the history of her community. In 2000 she became the inaugural curator and director of the new Japanese Canadian National Museum (now the Nikkei National Museum and Cultural Centre). She resigned from that position in 2002, but continued to collaborate with the museum as a guest curator. From 2005 until her 2010 retirement she was president of the National Association of Japanese Canadians.

Chiru Sakura: Falling Cherry Blossoms
In 2021, Thomson published a memoir based on her family's experience, Chiru Sakura: Falling Cherry Blossoms, published by Caitlin Press. At 84, Thomson's mother began keeping a journal in Japanese, recording her memories and family history. The memoir weaves together Thomson's translations of passages from her mother's diary along with her own stories of identity, trauma and racism and her efforts to find social justice for herself and others.

Chiru Sakura was shortlisted for the 2022 City of Vancouver Book Award.

References

1933 births
Living people
Activists from British Columbia
Alumni of the University of Leeds
Canadian art curators
Canadian memoirists
Canadian women activists
Canadian women memoirists
Japanese-Canadian internees
People from Richmond, British Columbia
University of Manitoba alumni
Writers from Vancouver
21st-century Canadian non-fiction writers
21st-century Canadian women writers
Canadian women curators